Klisman Cake (born 2 May 1999) is an Albanian professional footballer who plays as a centre-back for Albanian club  Shkëndija Tetovë  in the Liga e parë futbollistike e Maqedonisë së Veriut and the Albania national under-21 football team.

Club career

Early career & progress through ranks
Cake started his youth career with KF Tirana at age of 8. In 2011 he was placed at under-17 side. In the 2015–16 season he was named Captain and on 10 February 2016 he scored 1 goal via a Penalty kick to help his team to win the under-17 national cup beating 2–1 Olimpic U17 in the final. Then in the 2016–17 season he made an amazing progress through ranks playing with 3 different levels of KF Tirana's from under-19 to senior team. He started by playing with Under 19 side in the first half of the season during where he was called up to play with Tirana B in two occasions. Then in the second half of the season he became a regular member of the senior team under coach Mirel Josa following a "Window winter transfers bann" received from the club which made them to believe at academies products such as Cake, Grent Halili, Albi Doka and Marlind Nuriu.

International career
Cake received his first international level call up at the Albania national under-19 football team by coach Erjon Bogdani for a gathering in Durrës, Albania in April 2017 where they also played two friendly matches.

Career statistics

Club

Honours

Club
Tirana
Albanian Cup: 2016–17
Albanian Supercup: 2017
Albanian First Division : Winner Group B
Albanian First Division : 2017-2018

References

External links
Klisman Cake profile at KFTirana.al

1999 births
Living people
People from Pogradec
Albanian footballers
Albania youth international footballers
Albania under-21 international footballers
Association football central defenders
KF Tirana players
FC Struga players
KF Shkëndija players
Kategoria Superiore players
Kategoria e Dytë players
Macedonian First Football League players
Albanian expatriate footballers
Expatriate footballers in North Macedonia
Albanian expatriate sportspeople in North Macedonia